Julian Michael Hibberd (born December 1969) is a Professor of Photosynthesis at the University of Cambridge and a Fellow of Emmanuel College, Cambridge.

Education
Hibberd was educated at University of Wales, Bangor where he was awarded his first degree in 1991 followed by a PhD in 1994. His PhD thesis investigated the effects of elevated carbon dioxide (CO2) on powdery mildew in barley and was supervised by John Farrar and Bob Whitbread.

Research and career
Following his PhD, Hibberd completed three years of postdoctoral research at the University of Sheffield with Paul Quick, Malcolm Press and Julie Scholes, investigating interactions between parasitic plants and their hosts. He moved to Cambridge to work with John C. Gray in 1997, and started his own group in 2000.

The Hibberd laboratory investigates the efficiency of the C4 photosynthetic pathway, with the aim of understanding its repeated evolution and also contributing to improving crop productivity. Hibberd's research has been funded by the Bill and Melinda Gates Foundation the Biotechnology and Biological Sciences Research Council (BBSRC), the FP7 program of the European Union, and the European Research Council.

Hibberd was an Associate Editor from 2012-2022 of the scientific journal Plant Physiology.

Awards and honours
In 2008 Hibberd was named by the journal Nature as one of "Five crop researchers who could change the world" for his research that is attempting to replace C3 carbon fixation in rice with C4 carbon fixation. This would greatly increase the efficiency of photosynthesis and create a rice cultivar which could "have 50% more yield" which "would impact billions of people".

In 2000 Hibberd was awarded a BBSRC David Phillips Fellowship to investigate the role of photosynthesis in veins of C3 plants. In 2005 he was awarded a President's medal by the Society for Experimental Biology, and in 2007 The Melvin Calvin Award by the International Society of Photosynthesis Research.

References

Fellows of Emmanuel College, Cambridge
Academics of the University of Cambridge
Living people
1969 births